Rhona Valerie Rapoport (29 January 1927 – 24 November 2011) was a South African social scientist known for her research into work-life balance. Rapoport's 60 years of research and writing focused on work, life, gender, equity and diversity. She did this by working closely with her husband and government agencies in a number of different countries.

Biography 

Rapoport was born Rhona Ross in Cape Town, South Africa. It was here that she developed her strong moral and ethical sense to support those with the least power. She completed an undergraduate degree in social sciences at the University of Cape Town in 1946, and a PhD in sociology at the London School of Economics and trained to be a psychoanalyst at the London Institute of Psychoanalysis. After her training in 1957, Rhona married Robert Rapoport, a social anthropologist. They lived in Boston, Massachusetts until the mid-1960s, where Rhona was director of family research at the community mental health programme of the Harvard Medical School and School of Public Health. They moved to work with the Tavistock Institute in London and in 1973, they established the Institute of Family and Environmental Research in London. She worked at the Centre for Gender in Organisations at the Simmons Graduate School of Management in Boston during the 1990s.  Rapoport wrote or co-wrote more than 20 books. She was a consultant for two decades at the Ford Foundation. She died in 2011 and her ashes were buried with her husband's on the eastern side of Highgate Cemetery.

Research 
Rhona's approach brought together the worlds of psychology and sociology in order to explore the connection between home and work life. Rapoport's research appeared at a time when businesses and governments were trying to address inequalities in the workplace, and helped to develop policies and legislation. Her work at the Ford Foundation moved to address the 'worklife' balance issue raising this issue and developing understanding and leading to greater flexibility in many different counties. She developed an innovative technique of action research to support the participants in her studies. Working with her husband, they started to challenge the separation of paid work and family work and it gets done by both men and women.  In 2009 she was honoured by the organisation Working Families "for her sustained and influential research and new thinking in the field of work and family life". Much later this developed into views on how personal-life considerations need to be acknowledge within the workplace to balance and a better quality of life.

Publications

References 

1927 births
2011 deaths
Burials at Highgate Cemetery
Alumni of the London School of Economics
Women social scientists
South African social scientists
South African women scientists
University of Cape Town alumni